Andrzej Grębosz (born 26 April 1949) is a Polish former professional football player.

Career
Grębosz started his senior career with ŁKS Łódź, then he transferred to Widzew Łódź where he played most of his career, winning two consecutive Ekstraklasa in 1980–81 and 1981–82. He played European football with Widzew Łódź, reaching the Semi-finals in the 1982–83 European Cup.

Later on, he played in Germany for VfB Oldenburg and SV Arminia Hannover until his retirement in 1986.

References

1949 births
Living people
People from Ząbkowice Śląskie County
Polish footballers
Ekstraklasa players
ŁKS Łódź players
Widzew Łódź players
VfB Oldenburg players
Association football defenders
Widzew Łódź managers
Unia Tarnów players
Polish football managers
SV Arminia Hannover players